= Heat shock protein family d (hsp60) member 1 pseudogene 2 =

Pseudogene in the species Homo sapiens

HSPD1P2

Identifiers
- Aliases: HSPD1P2, HSP60P2, HSPD-9P, HSPDP2, heat shock protein family D (Hsp60) member 1 pseudogene 2, Heat shock protein family d (hsp60) member 1 pseudogene 2
- External IDs: GeneCards: HSPD1P2
Orthologs
Databases	NCBI: entry
Species	Human	Mouse
Entrez	645808	n/a
Ensembl	n/a	n/a
UniProt	n a	n/a
RefSeq (mRNA)	n/a	n/a
RefSeq (protein)	n/a	n/a
Location (UCSC)	n/a	n/a
PubMed search		n/a
- Wikidata
View/Edit Human

Heat shock protein family D (Hsp60) member 1 pseudogene 2 is a protein that in humans is encoded by the HSPD1P2 gene.
